Clouding of consciousness (also known as brain fog or mental fog) occurs when a person is slightly less wakeful or aware than normal. They are not as aware of time or their surroundings and find it difficult to pay attention. People describe this subjective sensation as their mind being "foggy".

Background
The term clouding of consciousness has always denoted the main pathogenetic feature of delirium since physician Georg Greiner pioneered the term in 1817. The Diagnostic and Statistical Manual of Mental Disorders (DSM)  has historically used the term in its definition of delirium. However, the DSM-III-R and the DSM-IV replaced "clouding of consciousness" with "disturbance of consciousness" to make it easier to operationalize, but it is still fundamentally the same thing. Clouding of consciousness may be less severe than delirium on a spectrum of abnormal consciousness. Clouding of consciousness may be synonymous with subsyndromal delirium.

Subsyndromal delirium differs from normal delirium by being overall less severe, lacking acuteness in onset and duration, having a relatively stable sleep-wake cycle, and having relatively stable motor alterations. The significant clinical features of subsyndromal delirium are inattention, thought process abnormalities, comprehension abnormalities, and language abnormalities. The full clinical manifestations of delirium may never be reached. Among intensive care unit patients, subsyndromal subjects were as likely to survive as patients with a Delirium Screening Checklist score of 0, but required extended care at rates greater than 0-scoring patients (although lower rates than those with full delirium) or have a decreased post-discharge level of functional independence vs. the general population but still more independence than full delirium.

In clinical practice, there is no standard test that is exclusive and specific; therefore, the diagnosis depends on the subjective impression of the physician. The DSM-IV-TR instructs clinicians to code subsyndromal delirium presentations under the miscellaneous category of "cognitive disorder not otherwise specified".

Psychopathology
The conceptual model of clouding of consciousness is that of a part of the brain regulating the "overall level" of the consciousness part of the brain, which is responsible for awareness of oneself and of the environment. Various etiologies disturb this regulating part of the brain, which in turn disturbs the "overall level" of consciousness. This system of a sort of general activation of consciousness is referred to as "arousal" or "wakefulness".

It is not necessarily accompanied by drowsiness, however. Patients may be awake (not sleepy) yet still have a clouded consciousness (disorder of wakefulness). Paradoxically, affected individuals say that they are "awake but, in another way, not". Lipowski points out that decreased "wakefulness" as used here is not exactly synonymous with drowsiness. One is a stage on the way to coma, the other on the way to sleep which is very different.

The affected person experiences a subjective sensation of mental clouding described in the patient's own words as feeling "foggy". One patient described it as "I thought it became like misty, in some way... the outlines were sort of fuzzy". Others may describe a "spaced out" feeling. Affected individuals compare their overall experience to that of a dream because as in a dream consciousness, attention, orientation to time and place, perceptions, and awareness are disturbed. Barbara Schildkrout, MD, a board-certified psychiatrist and clinical instructor in psychiatry at the Harvard Medical School described her subjective experience of clouding of consciousness, or what she also called "mental fog", after taking a single dose of the antihistamine chlorpheniramine for her cottonwood allergy while on a cross-country road trip. She described feeling "out of it" and being in a "dreamy state". She described a sense of not trusting her own judgment and a dulled awareness, not knowing how long time went by. Clouding of consciousness is not the same thing as depersonalization even though people affected by both compare their experience to that of a dream. Psychometric tests produce little evidence of a relationship between clouding of consciousness and depersonalization.

This may affect performance on virtually any cognitive task. As one author put it, "It should be apparent that cognition is not possible without a reasonable degree of arousal." Cognition includes perception, memory, learning, executive functions, language, constructive abilities, voluntary motor control, attention, and mental speed. The most significant, however, are inattention, thought process abnormalities, comprehension abnormalities, and language abnormalities. The extent of the impairment is variable because inattention may impair several cognitive functions. Affected individuals may complain of forgetfulness, being "confused", or being "unable to think straight". Despite the similarities, subsyndromal delirium is not the same thing as mild cognitive impairment; the fundamental difference is that mild cognitive impairment is a dementia-like impairment, which does not involve a disturbance in arousal (wakefulness).

In diseases 
The emerging concept of sluggish cognitive tempo has also been implicated in the expression of 'brain fog' symptoms.

Patients recovering from COVID-19 report experiencing 'brain fog', which can reflect a wide variety of neurological and psychological symptoms linked to COVID-19.

Many people with fibromyalgia experience cognitive problems (known as "fibrofog" or "brainfog"), which may involved impaired concentration, problems with short- and long-term memory, short-term memory consolidation, working memory, impaired speed of performance, inability to multi-task, cognitive overload, and diminished attention span. About 75% of fibromyalgia patients report significant problems with concentration, memory, and multitasking. A 2018 meta-analysis found that the largest differences between fibromyalgia patients and healthy subjects were for inhibitory control, memory, and processing speed. Many of these are also common symptoms of ADHD (attention deficit hyperactivity disorder), and the two conditions have been linked via studies, to the point that a diagnosis of fibromyalgia has been proposed as an indication to also screen for ADHD. In particular, the "brain fog" of ADHD has been linked to "fibro fog". It is alternatively hypothesized that the increased pain compromises attention systems, resulting in cognitive problems.

In chronic fatigue syndrome, also known as myalgic encephalomyelitis, the CDC's recommended criteria for diagnosis include that one of the following symptoms must be present:
 Problems with thinking and memory (cognitive dysfunction, sometimes described as "brain fog")
 While standing or sitting upright; lightheadedness, dizziness, weakness, fainting or vision changes may occur (orthostatic intolerance)

Lyme disease's neurologic syndrome, called Lyme encephalopathy, is associated with subtle memory and cognitive difficulties, among other issues. Lyme can cause a chronic encephalomyelitis that resembles multiple sclerosis. It may be progressive and can involve cognitive impairment, brain fog, migraines, balance issues, and extensive other issues.

See also

 Cannabis use disorder
 Cognitive orthotics
 Depersonalization disorder
 Excessive daytime sleepiness
 Four boxes test
 Idiopathic hypersomnia
 Insomnia
 Mental confusion
 Mild cognitive impairment
 Obtundation
 Postural orthostatic tachycardia syndrome (POTS)
 Post-chemotherapy cognitive impairment
 Pumphead syndrome
 Reactive hypoglycemia
 Sleep inertia
 Slow-wave sleep
 Somnolence
 Stupor

References

Symptoms and signs of mental disorders
Symptoms and signs: Nervous system
Cognitive disorders
Psychopathological syndromes

ru:Когнитивные нарушения
sr:Когнитивна дисфункција